A ceramic is an inorganic, nonmetallic solid material comprising metal, nonmetal or metalloid atoms primarily held in ionic and covalent bonds.

Ceramic may also refer to:

Objects
 Ceramic art, art made from ceramic materials
 Ceramic building material, an umbrella term used in archaeology to cover all building materials made from baked clay
 Ceramic capacitor, an electronic component with ceramic dielectric
 Ceramic heater, a space heater with a ceramic heating element
 Ceramic knife, a knife with a ceramic blade

Other uses
 Ceramic, North Carolina, a ghost town in the US
 SS Ceramic, a British ocean liner, built 1912–1913, sunk 1942 by German torpedo attack

See also
 Ceramic foam, a tough foam made from ceramics
 Ceramic resonator, an electronic component with a piezoelectric ceramic material
 Ceramic membrane, used in liquid filtration
 Ceramic houses, buildings made of an earth mixture high in clay and fired to become ceramic, a technique developed in Iran in the 1970s
 Ceramic engineering, the science and technology of creating ceramic objects
 Ceramic petrography, a laboratory-based scientific archaeological technique in which ceramics and other inorganic materials are examined using polarized light microscopy
 Ceramic chemistry, the chemistry of ceramics and glazes